The Aeromarine Merlin is an American homebuilt aircraft that was designed by Czech Aircraft Works and is produced by Aeromarine LSA of South Lakeland Airport, Florida, introduced at the Sport Aviation Expo in 2016. The aircraft is supplied as a kit, for amateur construction.

Design and development
The aircraft features a cantilever high-wing, a single-seat enclosed cabin, fixed tricycle landing gear and a single engine in tractor configuration.

The aircraft is made from aluminum sheet, with the engine cowling made from composite material. The design employs access doors that hinge vertically and a conventional low tail. Its  span wing mounts flaps. The standard engine used is the  Rotax 582 twin-cylinder two-stroke powerplant.

The manufacturer estimates the construction time from the supplied kit as two weeks at the factory completion center.

While initially offered as an amateur-built kit, future development plans include an electric powered version and a light-sport aircraft version that will be sold ready-to-fly.

Variants
Merlin-PSA
Initial "personal sport aircraft" version powered by a Rotax 582 two-stroke engine for the US Experimental Amateur-Built category.

Specifications (Merlin-PSA)

References

External links

Merlin
2010s United States sport aircraft
2010s United States ultralight aircraft
2010s United States civil utility aircraft
Single-engined tractor aircraft
High-wing aircraft
Homebuilt aircraft